Ralf de Pagter (born 22 July 1989) is a Dutch professional basketball player, who currently plays for Landstede Basketbal of the Dutch Basketball League. De Pagter usually plays at the power forward position.

International career
De Pagter played games for the Dutch national basketball team, starting from 2013. De Pager played with the Netherlands at EuroBasket 2015, where he appeared in two games.

Honours

Club
Den Bosch
Dutch Basketball League: 2014–15
NBB Cup: 2012–13, 2015–16
Dutch Supercup: 2013, 2015 
Landstede Hammers
Dutch Basketball League: 2018–19
Dutch Supercup: 2017

References

External links
Profile at Dutch Basketball League website
Profile at eurobasket.com

1989 births
Living people
Amsterdam Basketball players
Dutch Basketball League players
Dutch men's basketball players
Feyenoord Basketball players
Heroes Den Bosch players
Landstede Hammers players
Power forwards (basketball)
Sportspeople from Haarlem